Gaëlle Nohant is a French writer. She was born in Paris in 1973, and lives in Lyon. She has written several novels, including: 
 L’Ancre des rêves (winner of the prix Encre Marine, 2007) 
 La Part des flammes (winner of the prix France Bleu/Page des libraires, 2015 and the prix du Livre de Poche, 2016)
 Légende d’un dormeur éveillé (2017)

References

21st-century French women writers
French writers
1973 births
Living people
Date of birth missing (living people)